The Queen Elizabeth Hospital (Q.E.H.) is located in Barbados' capital city Bridgetown, which is located in the parish of Saint Michael. The hospital is the main General Hospital for the southern part of the island.

The hospital can perform most surgeries, and specialized care includes the areas of: gynaecology, paediatrics, obstetrics, cardiac surgery, plastic surgery, psychotherapy, radiology, radiography and ophthalmology. The Q.E.H. boasts also having a series of operating theaters.

The Q.E.H. is a 600-bed complex lying in the Eastern section of Bridgetown, located on the southeast bank of the Constitution River. The current hospital building was constructed in 1963–1964, and officially opened on 14 November 1964.

In December 2004, the Barbados Ministry of Health disclosed that based on foreign-investment into the country, there is a future possibility that genetic re-constructive surgery may be performed at the Q.E.H.

The Accident and Emergency Department, formerly known as QEH Casualty, was transformed in 1990 into the new A&E Department. The department was pioneered by Dr Irvine Brancker and Dr Van Tyne. It opened with a team of initially 12 junior doctors and 2 consultants. Presently, there are 20 doctors in the department. As the busiest department in the hospital, they attend to approximately 45,000 patients each year. Offering patient care on par with some first world countries, Dr Chaynie Williams, the first female head of the department, applauds the skill set of her staff and also notes that the A&E improvement programme has put measures in place to make the visit to A&E a more comfortable one, including the addition of patient advocates, a redesign of the physical space, improvements to staffing complements, improved outreach and efficiencies plus a concerted, ongoing effort to reduce waiting times.

In 2006 it was stated that the Government of Barbados was spending $112 million (US$56 million) annually running the hospital.

In 2008 the former Minister of Health Dr. Jerome Walcott said that the current hospital which is over 40 years old should be replaced by a new state of the art hospital complex. He classified it as nonsensical to spend over $400 million (US$200 million) on an extension of the current facility saying that it may cost upwards of $600 million (US$300 million) in the end.  He went on to suggest the current QEH might be better off turned into a nursing home. Later in 2011 the government's Donville Inniss gave the figure of around $800 million to build a new Hospital for Barbados. It was stated the government will need to review several factors including cost(s) and possible locations.

PAHO has rated the current facility as a Category B hospital facility.

See also

Saint Joseph Hospital

References

External links 

  – Queen Elizabeth Hospital (Bridgetown, Barbados)
 News article about QEH

Hospital buildings completed in 1964
Hospitals established in 1964
Hospitals in Barbados
Buildings and structures in Bridgetown